Ludmila Dayer-Middleton (born June 18, 1983) is a Brazilian-American actress, producer and director.

Career 
Dayer began acting at the age of 10 in the movie Carlota Joaquina – Princesa do Brasil released in 1995, for which she won her first award, the Associação Paulista de Críticos de Arte Award for Most Promising Actress. It would be the first of many throughout her career.
She rose to prominence after being discovered in a Spanish dance class and getting cast for a double role in two different languages in Carlota Joaquina: the Spanish infant princess Carlota and the little British girl Yolanda. At that time, she didn't yet speak English and Spanish fluently; but after only 2 months of training with a language coach, she could deliver her lines with a flawless accent in both languages.
For her next film "Traição" where she plays the "Diabólica" character by famous playwright Nelson Rodrigues, she got the "Candango" for best supporting actress at the Festival de Brasília.

The first part she landed as a teenager was a TV role in the Rede Manchete telenovela, Xica da Silva. In 2000, she moved to Brazil's biggest network, Rede Globo, to play the lead female in the teen soap Malhação. Dayer then rose to national fame through her role in the 2004 soap Senhora do Destino, where she embodied Danielle Meira, nicknamed "baby nymph" by her boyfriend Giovanni Improtta (José Wilker). That same year, she protagonized the movie Vida de Menina, based on the diaries of Helena Morley. She got nominated for best actress at the Festival de Gramado and Recife Cinema Festivalou "Cine PE" taking home the award for best actress. 

After the 2005 and the SBT soap opera Os Ricos Também Choram, Dayer moved to Los Angeles. There, she founded Lupi Productions, her film and television production company.

Personal life 
Dayer was born in Rio de Janeiro, Brazil. She holds both the Brazilian and US citizenships. In 2016, she married a British businessman. The couple currently lives in Los Angeles, California.

Filmography

Television

Film

References

External links 

1983 births
Living people
Brazilian emigrants to the United States
Actresses from Rio de Janeiro (city)
Brazilian people of German descent
Brazilian television actresses
Brazilian film actresses
People with acquired American citizenship